Baudry may refer to:

André Baudry (1922–2018), French writer
Antonin Baudry (born 1975), French diplomat
Armand Léon de Baudry d'Asson (1836–1915), French Legitimist politician
Christian Baudry (born 1955), French footballer
Gabriel Taschereau de Baudry, seigneur de Baudry (1673–1755), French administrator
Guillaume Baudry (1657–1732), Canadian gunsmith and gold and silversmith
Jacques Baudry de Lamarche (1676–c.1738), Canadian proprietor
Jean-Baptiste Baudry (1684–1755), Canadian gunsmith and gold and silversmith
Jean-Louis Baudry (1930–2015), French novelist
Louis-Narcisse Baudry Des Lozieres (1761–1841), French refugee and explorer
Marie-Victoire Baudry (1782–1846), French nun
Marvin Baudry (born 1990), Congolese footballer
Mathieu Baudry (born 1988), French footballer
Olivier Baudry (footballer, born 1970), French
Olivier Baudry (1973–2017), French footballer
Patrick Baudry (born 1946), French pilot and astronaut
Paul-Jacques-Aimé Baudry (1828–1886), French painter

See also
Baldric (disambiguation), for persons with the given name Baudry